Mount Katanglad is the highest elevation peak in the Kitanglad Mountain Range, located in Sumilao, Bukidnon. It is the second tallest mountain with Mount Dulang-dulang.

References

Mountains of the Philippines